Redvale may refer to:

Redvale, Colorado, United States
Redvale, New Zealand

See also
Redvales